Acacia wattsiana is a species of wattle native to South Australia.

References

wattsiana
Plants described in 1864